Maroni is a village located in the Larnaca District of Cyprus.

History
It has been a settlement since Middle Bronze Age.

Gallery

References

Communities in Larnaca District